The 2000–01 Macedonian Football Cup was the 9th season of Macedonia's football knockout competition. FK Sloga Jugomagnat were the defending champions, having won their second title the year before after reaching their fifth Final in a row. The 2000–01 champions were FK Pelister who beat the defending champions to claim their first title after twice been runners-up in the first 2 Macedonian Cups in 1992–93 & 1993–94.

Competition calendar

First round
Matches were played on 13 August 2000.

|colspan="3" style="background-color:#97DEFF" align=center|12 August 2000

|-
|colspan="3" style="background-color:#97DEFF" align=center|13 August 2000

|-
|colspan="3" style="background-color:#97DEFF" align=center|14 August 2000

|-
|colspan="3" style="background-color:#97DEFF" align=center|20 September 2000

|}

Source: Dnevnik.mk (archived)

Second round
The first legs were played on 8 November and second were played on 29 November 2000.

|}

Quarter-finals
The first legs were played on 25 February and second were played on 4 April 2001.

|}

Semi-finals
The first legs were played on 17 April 2001. The second legs were originally scheduled for 3 May 2001, but were postponed to 9 May 2001, due to situation at the border with FR Yugoslavia.

Summary

|}

Matches

Sloga Jugomagnat won 6–0 on aggregate.

Pelister won 4–3 on aggregate.

Final

See also
2000–01 Macedonian First Football League
2000–01 Macedonian Second Football League

References

External links
 2000–01 Macedonian Football Cup at rsssf.org
 Official Website
 Macedonian Football

Macedonia
Cup
Macedonian Football Cup seasons